Pennsylvania Route 467 (PA 467) is a  state highway located in Bradford County in Pennsylvania. The western terminus is at PA 187 in Rome Township in the hamlet of Myersburg. The eastern terminus is at PA 706 in Stevens Township near Stevensville.

Route description

PA 467 begins at an intersection with PA 187 (Rome Road) in the hamlet of Myersburg in Rome Township. The route progresses eastward on a bridge built in 1962 over Wysox Creek and enters a stretch of residences in Rome Township. After the intersections with State Route 1023 (SR 1023, Johnson Hill Road) and Joyce Road, PA 467 turns to the northeast and becomes more rural. After the intersection with Harmony Hill Road, the highway enters the hamlet of Allis Hollow. After the intersection with Ridge Road, PA 467 leaves the small community and makes a southeastern turn into Orwell Township. There, the highway intersects with SR 1010 (Otis Hill Road), where PA 467 bends to the northeast. In Orwell Township, PA 467 turns eastward after crossing Johnson's Creek. The highway passes numerous residences before turning northeastward into the hamlet of Zion Heights and soon Wells Hollow.

In Wells Hollow, PA 467 remains rural, forking eastward at an intersection with Township Road 781 and SR 1051. PA 467 follows Johnson's Creek eastward until the intersection with Amish Drive, where the route bends to the southeast into Pike Township. The highway remains rural, passing to the west of SR 1049 (Leraysville Road), which soon intersects and merges into PA 467. The highway gains the moniker of Warren Road then Main Street before turning southward and enters the borough of Le Raysville. In Le Raysville, PA 467 heads southward, intersecting with SR 1026 (East Street) in the center of town. At the intersection with 2nd Street, the highway leaves downtown Le Raysville but continues as Main Street until the intersection with SR 1013 (Davis Road), where it shifts names to Allis Hollow Road. PA 467 turns to the southwest, entering the hamlet of Brushville, where it intersects with the eastern terminus of SR 1010 (now named Allis Hollow Road as well). At that intersection, PA 467 turns to the south then southeast before changing to Le Raysville Road at the intersection with Helly Hill Road.

PA 467 maintains the southeastern progression, crossing through woodlands and fields for several miles and passing to the east of the Leisure Lakes. Paralleling Edwards Road and soon SR 1013, PA 467 enters Stevens Township, curves to the southwest and intersects with PA 706 east of the borough of Stevensville. This serves as the eastern terminus of PA 467.

Major intersections

PA 467 Truck

Pennsylvania Route 467 Truck (PA 467 Truck) is a truck route that was signed in September 2013 along SR 1010 from Brushville to just east of Le Raysville. It bypasses a small bridge with a 32-ton weight limit (40 tons for combination loads).

See also

References

External links

Pennsylvania Highways: PA 467

467
Transportation in Bradford County, Pennsylvania